Tango is an album by the American musician Patty Larkin, released in 1991. Larkin promoted the album by participating in the "On a Winter's Night" tour, with Christine Lavin and John Gorka.

Production
Recorded at Different Fur, in San Francisco, the album was produced by Larkin and Will Ackerman. Larkin played a 1946 Martin D-18 guitar. Lyle Workman contributed on electric guitar.

"Metal Drums" is about a toxic waste site in Holbrook, Massachusetts. "Waiting for the Dawn" concerns South Africa. "Solo Flight" is an instrumental.

Critical reception
The Washington Post wrote that "the ensemble creates delicate textures, with Larkin's percussive acoustic guitar and sandpaper-brushed near-whisper working against Michael Manring's fluid fretless bass, and Mike Marshall's mandolin."

Track listing

 "Tango"
 "Used To Be"
 "Upside Down"
 "Time Was"
 "Solo Flight"
 "Dave's Holiday"
 "Chained to These Lovin' Arms"
 "Metal Drums"
 "Letter from Vancouver"
 "Deadlines and Dollar Signs"
 "Waiting for the Dawn"
 "Kathleen"
 "Tango Reprise"

All songs were written by Patty Larkin.

Album personnel
 Patty Larkin - vocals, acoustic guitar
 Michael Manring- (fretless bass, e bow bass
 Brian MacLeod - drums, percussion
 Richard Gates - bass
 Lyle Workman - electric guitar
 Mike Marshall - mandolin
 Darol Anger - violin
 Josef Brinckmann - accordion
 John Gorka - backup vocals on "Dave's Holiday", "Chained to These Lovin' Arms"

References

Patty Larkin albums
1991 albums
Windham Hill Records albums
Albums produced by William Ackerman